The Arkansas GlacierCats were a short-lived minor-league hockey team located in Little Rock, Arkansas.

The Arkansas GlacierCats were a Western Professional Hockey League (WPHL) franchise in Little Rock, Arkansas. The team was owned by Ed Novess and Dan Hart of Austin, Texas and they played in the WPHL during the 1998–99 and 1999–2000 seasons. Home games were played at the old Barton Coliseum.

The GlacierCats were popular in their first year but were forced to suspend operations permanently in April 2000 largely due to competition by the Arkansas RiverBlades of the East Coast Hockey League who played at the newly opened ALLTEL Arena in North Little Rock, directly across the Arkansas River from downtown Little Rock.

References

Defunct companies based in Arkansas
Sports in Little Rock, Arkansas
Defunct ice hockey teams in the United States
Ice hockey teams in Arkansas
1998 establishments in Arkansas
2000 disestablishments in Arkansas